The men's 50 kilometres walk event at the 2020 Summer Olympics took place on 6 August 2021 in Sapporo. 59 athletes competed; the exact number was dependent on how many nations use universality places to enter athletes in addition to the number qualifying through time (no universality places were used in 2016).

Background
This was the 20th appearance of the event: except for 1976, it has appeared at every Olympics since 1932. The reigning champion is Matej Tóth of Slovakia.

Due to the Olympics' movement towards gender equality (the 50 kilometres walk was the only men's event on the 2020 athletics programme with no women's equivalent) and declining fan attendance and TV ratings for the event, the men's 50 kilometres walk will be replaced by a mixed-team relay - either a racewalk or a track event - in 2024.

Qualification

A National Olympic Committee (NOC) could enter up to 3 qualified athletes in the men's 50 kilometres walk if all athletes meet the entry standard or qualify by ranking during the qualifying period. (The limit of 3 has been in place since the 1930 Olympic Congress.) The qualifying standard is 3:50:00. This standard was "set for the sole purpose of qualifying athletes with exceptional performances unable to qualify through the IAAF World Rankings pathway." The world rankings, based on the average of the best five results for the athlete over the qualifying period and weighted by the importance of the meet, will then be used to qualify athletes until the cap of 60 is reached.

The qualifying period was originally from 1 January 2019 to 31 May 2020. Due to the COVID-19 pandemic, the period was suspended from 6 April 2020 to 30 November 2020, with the end date extended to 31 May 2021. The most recent Area Championships may be counted in the ranking, even if not during the qualifying period. In July 2020, World Athletics announced that the suspension period would be lifted for the road events (marathons and race walks) on 1 September 2020.

NOCs can also use their universality place—each NOC can enter one male athlete regardless of time if they had no male athletes meeting the entry standard for an athletics event—in the 50 kilometres walk.

Men's 50km walk

Competition format and course
The event consisted of a single race.

Records
Prior to this competition, the existing world, Olympic, and area records were as follows.

Schedule
All times are Japan Standard Time (UTC+9)

The men's 50 kilometres walk took place on a single day.

Results

References

Men's 50 kilometres walk
Racewalking at the Olympics
Men's events at the 2020 Summer Olympics